Mikael Mats Robert Persson (born 24 June 1983), better known by his stage name Mike Perry, is a Swedish DJ and music producer from Skövde. He is best known for his 2016 single "The Ocean" featuring vocals from Shy Martin, which peaked at number 1 on the Swedish Singles Chart. Other popular songs by Perry include "Inside the Lines", "Stay Young" and "Don't Hide".

Career

2012–2015: Beginnings
In 2007, Perry released "Psycadelic" with Stephan M. In 2012, Perry released "Put Me Up", an electronic dance music production on the Mark Brown label, and released on CR2 Records. This was followed by a collaboration with Cecilia Axeland called "We Don't Sleep in the Night" as well as "Whompin" with Filip Jenven. In 2013, Perry began releasing music in a "big room" style. Also in 2013, Miriam Bryant's "Push & Play" was remixed by Filip Jenven and Mike Perry. Perry released several pieces of music from 2013 to 2016.

2016: Breakthrough with "The Ocean"
After playing a track called "The Ocean", Sony Music Entertainment signed him up to their label. On 15 April 2016 the track was released, featuring vocals from Shy Martin. The song peaked at number 1 on the Swedish Singles Chart, also reaching the Top 10 in Austria, Finland, Germany, the Netherlands, Norway, Poland and Switzerland as well as the Top 20 in, Australia, Belgium, Denmark, France and Ireland as well as the Top 40 in Italy, New Zealand, Portugal and United Kingdom.

The follow-up single "Inside the Lines" was released on 21 October 2016. The track features vocals by Casso and reached number 19 in Finland and number 25 in Sweden. His third tropical house release in 2016 was the track "Touching You Again". It was produced with newcomers Hot Shade and Jane XØ as well as singer Phoebe Ryan. On 15 May 2017, Perry announced his upcoming single "Hands" featuring American singer Sabrina Carpenter and British boy band The Vamps, which was released later in the month.

Perry released more singles going into 2018 including "California" featuring Hot Shade and Karlyn and "Don't Hide" with Willemijn May, which number 35 and 31 on the Swedish charts respectively.

On 18 January 2019, Perry released "Runaway", peaking #1 position in  United States, Chile and Hungary.

In 2019, Perry released the single "Changes" with fellow DJs Ten Times and Dmitri Vangelis and Wyman with vocals from The Companions which reached number 65 in Sweden.

Discography

Singles

Notes

Other releases

Remixes

Awards and nominations

References

External links
 Mike Perry on Facebook

Remixers
Swedish record producers
Swedish DJs
Living people
Tropical house musicians
Electronic dance music DJs
1983 births